Prachuap Khiri Khan is one of the western provinces (changwat) of Thailand. Neighboring provinces include Phetchaburi to the north and Chumphon to the south. To the west, it borders Tanintharyi Region of Myanmar.

Geography
Prachuap Khiri Khan covers an area totaling . The province is on the Kra Isthmus, the narrow land bridge connecting the Malay Peninsula with mainland Asia. The province has the narrowest part of Thailand, just  from the Gulf of Thailand to the border with Myanmar in the Tenasserim Hills. The maximum elevations are found in the northeastern and central west regions, which make up approximately 30 percent of the province.

The long coast of the Gulf of Thailand has many sandy beaches. One of the best known, Hua Hin, has been a popular resort town since King Prajadhipok (Rama VII) built a summer palace there. From the coast the land quickly rises into the Tenasserim Hills, the mountain chain that forms the border with Myanmar. Due to its narrow watershed, the rivers in the province are all small. The only one of significance is the Pranburi River in the north. Among the smaller rivers is the Khlong Kui.

Prachuap Khiri Khan has a dubbed as "Mueang Sam Ao", which meaning "city of three bays", refers to Ao Noi, Ao Prachup, and Ao Manao all three bays are lined up and are located in the area of Mueang Prachuap Khiri Khan District.

Khao Sam Roi Yot National Park was established in 1966 to protect Thailand's largest freshwater marshes. The park contains some mangrove forests and mudflats. Most of the marshes were converted into shrimp farms, despite being in a national park. There are a total of six national parks, make up region 3 (Phetchaburi branch) of Thailand's protected areas. 
 Kaeng Krachan National Park, 
 Kui Buri National Park, 
 Namtok Huai Yang National Park, 
 Khao Sam Roi Yot National Park, 
 Hat Wanakom National Park, 
 Ao Siam National Park, 
There is Prince Chumphon North Park (upper) Wildlife Sanctuary,

History

The city of Muang Na Rang was reconstructed after it had been abandoned during the fall of the Ayutthaya Kingdom in 1767. The town was rebuilt at the mouth of the Ron River and renamed "Prachuap Khiri Khan" in 1855, which means 'city in the mountains'.

King Mongkut gathered the people of three towns—Bang Nangrom, Kui Buri, and Khlong Wan—and resettled them in the rebuilt city. At the same time, he renamed a portion of what is now Trat province and Koh Kong province in Cambodia "Patchan Khiri Khet". The name was chosen to rhyme with "Prachuap Khiri Khan" on the opposite side of the Gulf of Thailand at the same latitude.

In 1868, King Mongkut invited foreign guests to Prachuap Khiri Khan to watch a solar eclipse he had predicted for 18 August. The dignitaries viewed it from an observation point in the marshes near Sam Roi Yot. He contracted malaria, of which he died on 1 October.

In the reign of King Rama II, a new city was established at the mouth of the I Rom Canal known as Muang Bang Nang Rom. Prachuap became a seaside resort during the reign of King Rama V. Besides tourism, the province is heavily agricultural. Coconuts are a major crop. As much as 40 percent of farmers in Prachuap Khiri Khan solely cultivate coconuts.

At the beginning of World War II, Japanese troops invaded Thailand. On 8 December 1941, they struck first near the city of Prachuap Khiri Khan. After resisting the Japanese in the Battle of Prachuap Khiri Khan, after several hours the defenders were ordered to cease fire by the government in Bangkok.

Archaeology 
The discovery of 3,000 years old cave paintings was announced by archaeologists from the Fine Arts Office in a cave at the Khao Sam Roi Yod National Park in May 2020. Some of the depicted pictures are still visible and clear, while some paintings were damaged by limestone etching. According to archeologist Kannika Premjai, paintings describe humanlike figures with accessories on their bodies, hunting scenes with bow and arrow. Moreover, there is also an animal figure seems to be serow (a goat-like mammal found regionally) found among the drawings.

Symbols
The provincial seal shows the Kuha Karuhas Pavilion, which was built when King Chulalongkorn (Rama V) visited the Praya Nakorn Cave (Sam Roi Yot District). Depicted behind the pavilion is the island of Ko Lak in Prachuap Bay, the historic center of administration.

The provincial tree as well as the provincial flower is the rayan or manilkara (Manilkara hexandra). Milkfish (Chanos chanos) is a provincial fish.

The provincial slogan is 'City of pure gold, delectable coconuts and pineapples, delightful beaches, mountain and caves, land of spiritual beauty'.

Administrative divisions

Provincial government
The province is divided into eight districts (amphoes). The districts are further divided into 48 subdistricts (tambons) and 388 villages (mubans).

Local government
As of 26 November 2019 there are: one Prachuap Khiri Khan Provincial Administration Organisation and 16 municipal (thesaban) areas in the province. Prachuap Khiri khan and Hua Hin have town (thesaban mueang) status. Further 14 subdistrict municipalities (thesaban tambon). The non-municipal areas are administered by 44 Subdistrict Administrative Organisations - SAO (ongkan borihan suan tambon).

Transport

Air
Hua Hin Airport is in Hua Hin District. AirAsia serves the airport with a direct flight to Kuala Lumpur that commenced on 18 May 2018. In 7th August 2020, AirAsia flight to Huahin from Chiang Mai and from Udon Thani every Friday and Sunday.

Rail
The railway in Prachuap Khiri Khan is on the southern route from Bangkok. There are five major stations in Prachuap Khiri Khan: Hua Hin Railway Station, Pran Buri Railway Station, Prachuap Khiri Khan Railway Station, Bang Saphan Yai Railway Station, and Bang Saphan Noi Railway Station.

Road
Prachuap is on Thailand Route 4 (Phetkasem Road), which links the central region with the south.

Human achievement index 2017

Since 2003, United Nations Development Programme (UNDP) in Thailand has tracked progress on human development at sub-national level using the Human achievement index (HAI), a composite index covering all the eight key areas of human development. National Economic and Social Development Board (NESDB) has taken over this task since 2017.

Tourism

Thailand's royal family and especially former kings were the first to set this location on the map as the original seashore destination in Thailand. The long white sandy beaches themselves are clean and pretty. Besides sunbathing snorkeling and swimming, visitors can also enjoy golf, spas, caves, peaks, waterfalls, shops, and nearby national parks.

Gallery

References

External links

Prachuap Khiri Khan provincial map, coat of arms and postal stamp
Provincial website (Thai only)
Kui Buri National Park, Khiri Khan province

 
Provinces of Thailand